Molodyozhny is a rural locality (a settlement) in Zelyonovskoye Rural Settlement, Bykovsky District, Volgograd Oblast, Russia. The population was 117 as of 2010. There are 5 streets.

Geography 
Molodyozhny is located on the left bank of the Volga River, in Zavolzhye, 20 km south of Bykovo (the district's administrative centre) by road. Zelyony is the nearest rural locality.

References 

Rural localities in Bykovsky District